Rajen Borthakur (5 November 1964 – 10 December 2019) was an Indian politician. He was elected to the Assam Legislative Assembly from Rangapara in the 2019 by election as a member of the Bharatiya Janata Party. By-elections happened due to Pallab Lochan Das being elected to Parliament. Formerly, he was with Indian National Congress.

References

1965 births
2019 deaths
Bharatiya Janata Party politicians from Assam
People from Sonitpur district
Assam MLAs 2016–2021
Indian National Congress politicians